Xiang Yang Hong are a class of Chinese oceanographic survey and research ships. These were among China's first ocean survey vessels.

Fleet list 

 Xiang Yang Hong 01
 Xiang Yang Hong 03 — built 2016
 Xiang Yang Hong 05
 Xiang Yang Hong 06
 Xiang Yang Hong 09 — built 1978
 Xiang Yang Hong 10
 Xiang Yang Hong 14 — Type 645 oceanographic research ship
 Xiang Yang Hong 16 — 
 Xiang Yang Hong 21 — Type 813 spy ship

Xiang Yang Hong 01

Xiang Yang Hong 09 
The Xiang Yang Hong 09 was the first Chinese ship to take part in distant-water research in the 1970s. 2006 onwards the ship successfully supported submersibles, including supporting the domestic record dive in Mariana Trench.

In popular culture 
The second book of Ian Douglas's Star Carrier contained a reference to a Chinese ship named Xiang Yang Hong which had used nuclear warheads to alter the course of an asteroid.

References 

Maritime history of China
Research vessels of China